Chochkan is a village in the Lori Province of Armenia.

References
 
 World Gazeteer: Armenia – World-Gazetteer.com

Populated places in Lori Province